Tiruchirappalli–Karur–Erode line is a railway line in Southern Railway zone of Indian Railways.

History 
The construction of this line began connecting South Indian Railway and Madras Railway. Erode Junction on Jolarpettai–Shoranur line was under Madras Railway whereas Tiruchirappalli Junction was under South Indian Railway.

High-speed trial
A high-speed trial run has been conducted along this line to increase the speed of trains. This trial run at 125kmph was attempted to increase the operating speed of trains from 100kmph to 110kmph along this section.

Gauge conversion 
The metre-gauge line has been converted into broad gauge during 1929. In September 1929, the entire stretch of  has been completely converted into broad gauge in just 5 hours of time. The first broad-gauge train from Erode Junction reached Tiruchirappalli Junction, exactly 5 hours after the reach of last metre-gauge train. The route has been electrified in February 2018.

References

Salem railway division
Trichy railway division
5 ft 6 in gauge railways in India
Rail transport in Tiruchirappalli
Transport in Erode